Robert Affleck may refer to:

Robert Bruce Affleck (born 1954), ice hockey player
Sir Robert Affleck, 4th Baronet of the Affleck Baronets (1763–1851)
Sir Robert Affleck, 6th Baronet of the Affleck Baronets (1805–1882)
Sir Robert Affleck, 7th Baronet of the Affleck Baronets (1852–1919)